Corey Williams (born August 17, 1980) is a former American football defensive tackle. He was drafted by the Green Bay Packers in the sixth round of the 2004 NFL draft. He played college football at Arkansas State.

Williams has also played for the Cleveland Browns and Detroit Lions.

College career
After graduating from Harmony Grove High School, Williams played as a defensive lineman for Arkansas State from 2000-2003. He majored in sport management.

Professional career

Green Bay Packers
Williams was originally selected by the Green Bay Packers in the sixth round (179th overall) in the 2004 NFL Draft. In his rookie season, he played in 12 games and finished the season with 24 tackles. He made his NFL debut at the Carolina Panthers on  September 13. In the 2005 season he again played in 12 games and finished the season with 34 tackles.

In a November 5, 2006 game versus the Buffalo Bills, Williams turned in the first-ever three-sack game by a Packers defensive tackle. He finished the year with career highs in sacks (7) and tackles (47).

On September 16, 2007, Williams recorded the first interception of his NFL career, returning an Eli Manning pass 9 yards in a 35-13 victory over the New York Giants.

Williams was voted the GMC Defensive Player of the Week for games played on November 18–19, 2007. Williams posted four solo tackles, two sacks and two forced fumbles during the game.

He finished the 2007 season with 51 tackles, a career-high.

Cleveland Browns
On February 20, 2008, the Packers placed the franchise tag on Williams. Ten days later, Williams was traded to the Cleveland Browns for a second-round draft pick.

Detroit Lions
On March 4, 2010, Williams was traded to the Detroit Lions along with a 7th round pick in exchange for a 5th round pick in the 2010 NFL Draft.

References

Cleveland Browns also took a 6th round pick.

External links
Cleveland Browns bio

1980 births
Living people
People from Camden, Arkansas
Players of American football from Arkansas
American football defensive tackles
American football defensive ends
Arkansas State Red Wolves football players
Green Bay Packers players
Cleveland Browns players
Detroit Lions players